Iga Świątek defeated Ons Jabeur in the final, 6–2, 7–6(7–5) to win the women's singles title at the 2022 US Open. It was her third major title, and second of the season, making Świątek the first player since Angelique Kerber in 2016 to win multiple majors in a season. Świątek became the first Polish woman in the Open Era to reach the US Open quarterfinals, semifinals, and final. Świątek also became the youngest woman to win three majors since Maria Sharapova in 2008.

Emma Raducanu was the defending champion, but lost in the first round to Alizé Cornet. It was the third time the defending US Open champion lost in the first round, after Svetlana Kuznetsova in 2005 and Kerber in 2017. This marked the second consecutive major where Cornet defeated a reigning major champion (following her victory over reigning French Open champion and world No. 1 Świątek at Wimbledon). Cornet made her 63rd consecutive major appearance, surpassing the all-time record she had jointly held with Ai Sugiyama.

This tournament marked the final professional appearance for 23-time singles major champion, Olympic singles gold medalist, and former world No. 1 Serena Williams; she lost to Ajla Tomljanović in the third round. This was the longest match of her career, that lasted three hours and five minutes. With her victory over second-ranked Anett Kontaveit in the second round, Williams became the oldest player to defeat a top-three player on the WTA Tour.

This tournament marked the first time in the Open Era that four Chinese women reached the third round. Elena Rybakina lost in the first round to Clara Burel; that marked the first time that the reigning Wimbledon champion had lost in the first round of the US Open since Petra Kvitová in 2011. Elise Mertens had her streak of 17 consecutive major third-rounds broken after losing in the first round to Irina-Camelia Begu.

This was the first edition of the US Open to feature a 10-point tie-break, when the score reaches six games all in the deciding set. Karolína Plíšková defeated Magda Linette in the first round in the first women's singles main-draw 10-point tie-break at the US Open.

Seeds

Draw

Finals

Top half

Section 1

Section 2

Section 3

Section 4

Bottom half

Section 5

Section 6

Section 7

Section 8

Championship match statistics

Seeded players
The following are the seeded players. Seedings are based on WTA rankings as of August 22, 2022. Rankings and points are as before August 29, 2022.

† The player did not qualify for the tournament in 2021 and is defending points from two ITF tournaments (Collonge-Bellerive and Montreux) instead.
‡ The player was not required to include zero points for the 2021 tournament in her ranking due to the WTA's COVID-19 rules. Accordingly, points for her 16th best result will be deducted instead.

Other entry information

Wild cards

Source:

Protected ranking

Qualifiers

Lucky losers

Withdrawals
The entry list was released by the United States Tennis Association based on the WTA rankings for the week of July 18.

 – not included on entry list& – withdrew from entry list

Explanatory notes

References

External links
 Entry List
 Draw

Women's Singles
US Open - Women's Singles
2022